Battersby's caecilian (Indotyphlus battersbyi) is a slender species of caecilian endemic to the Western Ghats, India. It has a flesh-coloured body, making it look very much like a large earthworm.

Description
The eyes of Battersby's caecilian are concealed under the skin and are feebly visible. It is also known as the tailless caecilian, as the body ends in a blunt shield. The vent in this species is transverse as opposed to longitudinal in most other species of Indian caecilians.

Distribution and status
Battersby's caecilian is distributed in the Western Ghats in Maharashtra and Kerala (India).

The population is unknown and threats are also not well known but are thought to be land changes for agriculture, wood and timber extracting by locals, road construction, agrochemical soil pollution and fires. It occurs in Sanjay Gandhi National Park and may occur in Koyna Wildlife Sanctuary and Phansad Wildlife Sanctuary.

Eponym
Battersby's caecilian is named in honour of James Clarence Battersby (1901–1993), herpetologist at the British Museum (Natural History), London, for 45 years.

References

Indotyphlidae
Amphibians of India
Endemic fauna of the Western Ghats
Fauna of Maharashtra
Fauna of Kerala
Amphibians described in 1960